Lonesome Cowboys is a 1968 American Western film directed by Andy Warhol and  written and produced by Paul Morrissey. The film is a satire of Hollywood Westerns, and was initially screened in November 1968 at the San Francisco International Film Festival, where it won the Best Film Award. On May 5, 1969, it was shown for initial viewings at the New Andy Warhol Garrick Theatre in New York City.

Production
Lonesome Cowboys was shot in January 1968 in Old Tucson and the Rancho Linda Vista Dude Ranch in Oracle, Arizona on a budget of $3,000. The film features Warhol superstars Viva, Taylor Mead, Louis Waldon, Eric Emerson, and Joe Dallesandro. The plot loosely is based on Romeo and Juliet, hence the names Julian and Ramona of the two leads. While in Arizona on a college lecture tour in November 1967, Warhol booked film screenings of excerpts from Chelsea Girls followed by a question-and-answer session with the artist, Morrissey,  Viva, and Allen Midgette at Arizona State University and the Cinema I Film Society at the Tucson Jewish Community Center. Warhol and Viva apparently both enjoyed their time in Arizona so much that they made plans to find a way to return, which culminated in Paul Morrissey's writing the screenplay for Lonesome Cowboys to be shot there two months later. A detailed first-hand account of Warhol's time in Tucson by Cinema I director Shirley Pasternack was published in the May 1989 issue of Tucson City Magazine.

The film was shot on 16 mm film using an Auricon camera, recording the sound directly onto the film. Warhol deliberately stopped and started the camera during takes to include flash frames and audio pops in the middle of shots.

Warhol initially planned to title the film Fuck, then The Glory of the Fuck. Warhol and Morrissey settled on Lonesome Cowboys while Warhol was convalescing following the attempt on his life by Valerie Solanas. John Schlesinger was filming Midnight Cowboy, which featured several members of Warhol's entourage, including Viva and Ultra Violet who, with Morrissey, shot a separate short film during shooting of Midnight Cowboy's elaborate party scene. Warhol initially endorsed the participation of his people but grew resentful at what he perceived as Schlesinger's poaching of Warhol's scene. Warhol decided to undercut Schlesinger by naming this film Lonesome Cowboys as a reference to Midnight Cowboy. The original poster promoting the film, designed by George Abagnalo, is shown prominently in a portrait of Warhol by Jack Mitchell.

Cast
 Joe Dallesandro as Joe "Little Joe"
 Julian Burroughs as Brother
 Eric Emerson as Eric	
 Tom Hompertz as Julian	
 Taylor Mead as Nurse
 Viva as Ramona D'Alvarez
 Louis Waldon as Mickey
 Francis Francine as Sheriff

Reception

In August 1969, the film was seized by police in Atlanta, Georgia, personnel at The Ansley Mall Mini Cinema were arrested, and the entire audience was searched by police for their identifications. The event was considered a turning point in the city's LGBT community and led to the first Atlanta Pride two years later.

Remakes
A 2010 remake by Marianne Dissard titled Lonesome Cowgirls was shot in Tucson, Arizona.

See also
 Andy Warhol filmography
 List of American films of 1968

References

Further reading
 Hofler, Robert (2014). Sexplosion: From Andy Warhol to A Clockwork Orange - How a Generation of Pop Rebels Broke All the Taboos. New York: itbooks, an imprint of HarperCollins Publishers. .
 Pasternack, Shirley (May 1989). Andy Warhol in Tucson. Tucson, AZ: City Magazine. {pages 38–42}.

External links 
 
 Lonesome Cowboys at WarholStars
 

1968 films
1968 LGBT-related films
1960s English-language films
Films directed by Andy Warhol
1968 Western (genre) films
American Western (genre) films
Films based on Romeo and Juliet
LGBT-related adaptations of works by William Shakespeare
1960s American films